Satisfaction Kills Desire is the fifth album by the Belgian band Zornik.

Track listing

References 

2010 albums
Zornik albums